Sunder Singh Bhandari (12 April 192122 June 2005) was an Indian politician, a Rashtriya Swayamsevak Sangh pracharak and  politician belonging to the Bharatiya Jana Sangh and Bharatiya Janata Party.

Early life and education 
He was born to Dr. Sujan Singhji Bhandari and Fulkanvarbaiji in Udaipur in 1921 he had his school education at Sirohi and Udaipur and college education at Kanpur. He passed his Graduation degree in law from S.D. College, Kanpur in the year 1941 and Post Graduation in Arts with Psychology from Dayanand Anglo-Vedic College, Kanpur in the year 1942.

Career 
He practised law at then Mewar High Court for some time before joining Rashtriya Swayamsevak Sangh (RSS). He held numerous responsibilities in RSS. He was a founding member of Jan Sangh, a political party founded in 1951.

He served in various organisational posts in Jan Sangha and later in the BJP. He was the Vice President of BJP before he became the Governor. He was elected to Rajya Sabha from Rajasthan during 1966-1972 and from Uttar Pradesh in 1976 and also in 1992.

He was arrested at Delhi Railway station in 1976 when Indira Gandhi declared an internal emergency in India.

He was appointed Governor of Bihar on 27 April 1998 and served until 15 March 1999. He served as the governor of Gujarat from 18 March 1999 to 6 May 2003. He died on 22 June 2005.

References

External links 
 Bihar governor

Governors of Bihar
Governors of Gujarat
Bharatiya Janata Party politicians from Rajasthan
Bharatiya Jana Sangh politicians
Rashtriya Swayamsevak Sangh pracharaks
People from Udaipur
1921 births
2005 deaths
Rajya Sabha members from Rajasthan
Indian politicians with disabilities
Politicians from Udaipur
Rajya Sabha members from the Bharatiya Janata Party